The TechArt 997 Turbo, also known as simply the TechArt Turbo, is a high-performance sports car based on the Porsche 997 Turbo. TechArt has modified the car extensively, fitting it with a body kit, interior modifications, and significant engine tuning.

Design and Features
To the stock Porsche 997 Turbo, TechArt has added a body kit featuring new front and rear spoilers, carbon fibre grille, headlight covers, and side skirts. The car is fitted with TechArt's own 20" wheels, with Michelin Pilot tires to improve handling. The interior is trimmed out with carbon fiber and custom upholstery as well. The most significant modification to the car is under the engine lid. TechArt has modified the stock  flat-6 with larger turbochargers, improved engine control unit chip, and stainless steel exhaust system. Customers pay for the base 997 Turbo, which costs $122,900 USD, then add the desired modifications; the bodykit costs $11,000 USD, while the engine upgrades are $29,500 USD. The full package retails for about $186,000 USD.

Specifications
Weight: 
Power:  at 6400 rpm
Torque:  at 3700 rpm
Specific output: approx.  per litre
Weight-to-power ratio: approx.  per horsepower
0-: 3.4 sec
0-: 7.4 sec
Quarter mile: 11.5 sec at 
Top Speed: 
Braking, -0: 
Braking, -0: 
Lateral acceleration: .94g

References
Road & Track, July 2007 "Pumped up Porsches"
TechArt Tuning for the new Porsche 911 Turbo (997)

External links
TechArt official 997 Turbo page

Coupés
Rear-wheel-drive vehicles
TechArt vehicles
Cars powered by boxer engines

Rear-engined vehicles